Valentin Chaikin (26 August 1925 – 13 September 2018) was a Russian speed skater.

He set a world record in 1500 m in Medeo in 1952, with the time 2:12.9, beating Hans Engnestangen's previous record from 1939.

World record 

Source: SpeedSkatingStats.com

References

External links
 

1925 births
2018 deaths
Russian male speed skaters
Soviet male speed skaters
World record setters in speed skating
Sportspeople from Kirov, Kirov Oblast